Diegylis (Ancient Greek: Διήγυλις) was a chieftain of the Thracian Caeni tribe and father of Ziselmius. He is described by ancient sources (such as Diodorus Siculus) as extremely bloodthirsty.

See also 
List of Thracian tribes

References 

Thracian kings
2nd-century BC rulers in Europe